Adam Christopher McGechan (born 2 February 1978 in Auckland, New Zealand), who writes under the name Adam Christopher, is a New Zealand novelist. In 2006, he moved from New Zealand to North West England, where he lives with his wife.

Career
Christopher has released several books through Angry Robot and Tor Books. He has also worked as an editor for nine issues of Time/Space Visualiser, the journal of the New Zealand Doctor Who Fan Club, from 2003 to 2009. In 2010, he won a Sir Julius Vogel Award for Best Fan Publication for TSV.

Bibliography

Standalone novels 
 Seven Wonders (September 2012 –  [UK] |  [US], Angry Robot)
 Hang Wire (2014, Angry Robot)

Series

Empire State
 Empire State (January 2012 –  [UK] |  [US], Angry Robot)
 The Age Atomic (2013, Angry Robot)

Ray Electromatic Mysteries 
"Brisk Money" is a novelette published by Tor.com in 2014 set in the same universe of the Ray Electromatic Mysteries.
 Made to Kill (2015, Tor Books)
 Standard Hollywood Depravity (2017, Tor Books)
 Killing Is My Business (2017, Tor Books)
 I Only Killed Him Once (2018, Tor Books)

Spider Wars
 The Burning Dark (2014, originally titled Shadow's Call, Tor Books)
 The Machine Awakes (2015, originally titled The Jovian Conspiracy, Tor Books)
"Cold War" is a novelette published by Tor.com in 2014 set in the same universe of the Spider Wars series.

Tie-in fiction

Dishonored 
 Dishonored: The Corroded Man (September 27, 2016, Titan Books)
 Dishonored: The Return of Daud (March 27, 2018, Titan Books)
 Dishonored: The Veiled Terror (2018, Titan Books)

Elementary 
 Elementary: The Ghost Line (2015, Titan Books)
 Elementary: Blood and Ink (2016, Titan Books)

Stranger Things 
 Stranger Things: Darkness on the Edge of Town (2019, Del Rey)

Star Wars 
 "End of Watch" in Star Wars: From A Certain Point of View (2017, Del Rey)
 "The Witness" in Star Wars: From A Certain Point of View: The Empire Strikes Back (2020, Del Rey)
 Shadow of the Sith (2022, Del Rey)

Comics

Dark Circle Comics/Archie Comics 
 The Shield vol. 5 #1-4 (with Chuck Wendig and Drew Johnson, October 2015-November 2016)

Star Wars Adventures 
 Alone in the Dark in Star Wars Adventures #26 (with Megan Levens, September 25, 2019)

Lazarus 
 Ganymede in Lazarus: Rising #2 (prose short story, illustrated by Michael Lark, July 24, 2019)

References

External links
 Official site
 Adam Christopher at Del Rey/Penguin Random House
 Adam Christopher at Angry Robot Books
 Adam Christopher at Tor Books/Macmillan Publishing

New Zealand male novelists
People from Auckland
1978 births
Living people
21st-century New Zealand novelists
New Zealand crime fiction writers
New Zealand mystery writers
New Zealand science fiction writers
21st-century New Zealand male writers